International Medical Relief is an international non-government organization (NGO) based in Colorado, United States, that provides health care to vulnerable and under-served populations by recruiting health care professionals and volunteer doctors. International Medical Relief provides disaster response both domestically and internationally with first responder medical teams that provide rapid response health care to meet the immediate needs of communities in need.

Background and current operations 
International Medical Relief was founded in 2002 by Shauna Vollmer King on the belief that healthcare should not be the prerogative of select nations and regions, or classes. It should be given to all who need it. IMR undertakes this work by including local medical and dental professionals to share knowledge about diagnoses and treatment. IMR enhances the health care to underdeveloped communities through services provided in collaboration with doctors and professional partners. IMR provides free health care services, supplies to communities who are poor, ill and sick and have any kind of disease. IMR begin each clinic with team members to foster community development and interaction and to proceed through pre-arranged logistics.

Mission

IMR offers medical services and sustainable health education to all vulnerable and underserved communities around the globe. IMR focuses on improving the health and quality of life of those underserved populations that are most in need. IMR is a global nonprofit health care provider that sustains and enhances global community health by offering them compassionate, responsive, quality healthcare services and training.

Operations

International Medical Relief helps in the well-being of communities that are underdeveloped through needed services provided by doing collaboration with partners.

Health Care Services

IMR provides free healthcare medicines, services and as well as supplies to underserved communities, especially to the communities sick, frail, and poor people who are at a major risk of ill, poor health and different diseases. To foster the interaction of community and as well as development. IMR starts each clinic with the help of team members and introducing them to other members and community leaders.

Sustainable Community Health Education:

IMR's each clinic includes basic health education according to the specialties and skills of the IMR volunteers, as well as the needs of the local people. When communities become empowered to take health and wellness issues into their own hands, they become self-sufficient. IMR provides learning opportunities for the local communities through classes and hands-on learning to sustain their well-being beyond a visit.

Current operations 
International Medical Relief works in some 78 countries in Africa, Panamerica, Asia, Europe and the Middle East, providing medical relief, sustainable education and disaster response. With diligent planning and preparation, International Medical Relief is dedicated to ensuring that specific goals are met on our missions, each in correlation to the United Nations Sustainable Development Goals.

Disaster response 
International Medical Relief has conducted disaster relief response over 19 countries, with a team that includes EMTs, doctors, nurses, dentists, and students. These teams reach beyond borders to initiate critical care to the most effected communities. IMR has responded to earthquakes, hurricanes, tsunamis, typhoons, cyclones, and volcano eruptions. International Medical Relief has also provided disaster relief for people impacted by the following earthquakes: 2008 China earthquake, 2010 Chile earthquake, 2010 Haiti earthquake, April 2015 Nepal earthquake, 2018 Indonesia Lombok earthquake, 2018 Haiti earthquake, and the April 2015 Nepal earthquake. International Medical Relief has provided a response to the following hurricanes: 2019 Hurricane Dorian Bahamas, 2017 Hurricane Maria Puerto Rico, and 2016 Hurricane Otto Nicaragua. Other disaster response efforts include 2004 Banda Aceh Tsunami, 2008 Cyclone Nargis Myanmar, 2011 Libya Civil conflict, 2013 Typhoon Haiyan Philippines, 2016 Congo Famine, 2015 Ethiopia droughts, 2016 Syrian refugee crisis Greece, 2018 Volcano Fuego eruption Guatemala and COVID-19 virus pandemic.

References

External links 
 International Medical Relief - Official Website

Health charities in the United States
International medical and health organizations
Medical and health organizations based in Colorado
Emergency medicine organisations